Tears in the Rain is a Pop song by Scottish singer Maggie Reilly. The song was produced by Armand Volker. It was released as the fourth and final single from her debut studio album Echoes (1992). The single's B-side "Only a Fool" also appeared on the album.

Formats and track listings
 CD / 7" Single
"Tears in the Rain" – 3:44
"Only a Fool" – 4:57

Charts

References

1992 singles
Maggie Reilly songs
1992 songs
EMI Records singles